The Carlton Club is a private members' club in St James's, London. It was the original home of the Conservative Party before the creation of Conservative Central Office. Membership of the club is by nomination and election only.

History

The club was founded in 1832, by Tory peers, MPs and gentlemen, as a place to coordinate party activity after the party's defeat over the First Reform Act. The 1st Duke of Wellington was a founding member; he opposed the 1832 Reform Act and its extension of the right to vote. The club played a major role in the transformation of the Tory party into its modern form as the Conservative Party. It lost its role as a central party office with the widening of the franchise after the Reform Act 1867, but it remained the principal venue for key political discussions between Conservative ministers, MPs and party managers.

Formation location
The club was formed at the Thatched House Tavern in 1832 and its first premises were in Carlton House Terrace (provided by Lord Kensington), from which it drew its name. These premises were quickly found too small. The second clubhouse was situated near the Reform Club at 94 Pall Mall, London, and was purpose-built in 1835.  It was replaced by a third clubhouse on the same site in 1856.

The Caen stone used on the façade of the third building proved unsuitable in the London atmosphere and had to be completely replaced in 1923–24.

1922 Carlton Club meeting

The club is most famous for the Carlton Club meeting of 19 October 1922, in which backbench Conservative MPs decided to withdraw from the David Lloyd George–led coalition government. MPs voted in favour of discontinuing the coalition, after speeches from Bonar Law and Stanley Baldwin, with Baldwin saying that the fact Lloyd George was a 'dynamic force' was a danger to the stability of the Conservative party. Austen Chamberlain resigned as leader and Bonar Law formed a purely Conservative government.

Bombing by the Luftwaffe and move to current building
The club suffered a direct hit during the Blitz on 14 October 1940, Observers, including the diarist Harold Nicolson, noted Quintin Hogg (then a young Conservative MP, later the 2nd Viscount Hailsham) carrying his elderly, disabled father Lord Hailsham from the building; they had been dining together prior to the former's departure for active service in North Africa. The Chief Whip David Margesson, who was living at the Club since his recent divorce, was left homeless and had to sleep for a time on a makeshift bed in the underground Cabinet Annexe.

No one was killed in the explosion, but the building was destroyed. The Carlton immediately moved to its current premises, at 69 St James's Street, formerly the premises of Arthur's Club – one of the premier gentlemen's clubs, which had closed the same year, after 150 years of operations. The current Georgian clubhouse is architecturally important (Grade II* listed) and includes two elegant dining rooms, together with a collection of political portraits and paintings dating back to the 18th century, imported from ruins of the old clubhouse and the former Junior Carlton Club (see below). The current Carlton has not retained any of the furnishings belonging to the building when it was Arthur's club, apart from the war memorial plaque in the entrance. There is a marble Arthur's Club World War I War Memorial to be found on the wall by the stairs in the main vestibule of St James's Church Piccadilly (designed by Wren). The walls of the Disraeli and Macmillan rooms and their windows at the back of the club were part of the fabric of the original White's Club building.

Junior Carlton Club
The Junior Carlton Club, which was entirely separate from the Carlton itself, was established in 1864 and occupied a large purpose-built clubhouse, completed in 1869, at 30 Pall Mall, almost opposite the Carlton. This was sold early in the 1960s and part of the proceeds used to buy the site of the former Carlton Club building at 94 Pall Mall. The erection of the new clubhouse on the site of 30 Paull Mall in a modern 1960s prototype 'club of the future' led to mass resignations from that club. In December 1977 it formally merged with the Carlton Club, with negotiations conducted by Harold Macmillan.

Bombing by IRA

At 8:39 p.m. on 25 June 1990, the Carlton Club was bombed by the Provisional Irish Republican Army (IRA), injuring more than 20 people. Lord Kaberry died the following year at age 83 from the injuries he had sustained.

Chris Pincher scandal

The club was the place at which Chris Pincher, the deputy chief whip, was alleged to have committed sexual assault on two men on 29 June 2022. The revelations following this scandal led to the government crisis and the resignation of the Prime Minister, Boris Johnson.

Membership
Historically and by tradition, only males could become full members after being proposed and seconded by two current members who have known the applicant and been members themselves for at least two years. From the 1970s onwards, women were allowed to become associate members, meaning they were unable to vote. On becoming Conservative leader in 1975, Margaret Thatcher was made an honorary member of the club and, as such, until 2008 was the only female member entitled to full membership. Thatcher was elected as the club's second president (the first was Harold Macmillan) in May 2009.

A separate, unrelated Ladies' Carlton Club was established after the First World War as a social and political centre for Conservative women. It closed in 1958.

A full history of the club was published by historian Lord Lexden to mark its 175th anniversary in 2007.

 the club had around 1500 members and membership cost upwards of £1700 per year.

Opposition to membership 

The Prime Minister Arthur Balfour was a reluctant member, complaining about the club in the early 1900s.

Former Conservative Party leader Iain Duncan Smith refused Carlton Club membership when it was offered to him in 2001 because women, at that time, were unable to become full members.

Notable members

Leo Amery
Michael Ancram, Baron Kerr of Monteviot
Stanley Baldwin
Arthur Balfour
Alexander Bruce, 6th Lord Balfour of Burleigh
F. E. Smith, 1st Earl of Birkenhead
William Bridgeman, 1st Viscount Bridgeman
St John Brodrick
Patrick Buchan-Hepburn
Rab Butler
David Cameron
George Cave, 1st Viscount Cave
Austen Chamberlain
Neville Chamberlain
John Colomb
Harry Crookshank
Philip Cunliffe-Lister
Aretas Akers-Douglas, 1st Viscount Chilston
Lord Randolph Churchill
Winston Churchill (twice; a member 1900–5, resigned when he defected to the Liberal party, and rejoined from 1926 until his death)
Ronald McNeill, 1st Baron Cushendun
J. C. C. Davidson, 1st Viscount Davidson
Jim Davidson
Edward Stanley, 17th Earl of Derby
Benjamin Disraeli
Sir Alec Douglas-Home
Sir Anthony Eden
Walter Elliot
Bolton Eyres-Monsell
Christopher Gabbitas
Sir John Gilmour
William Ewart Gladstone
William Hague
Michael Heseltine
Douglas Hogg, 1st Viscount Hailsham
Douglas Hogg, 3rd Viscount Hailsham
Quintin Hogg, Baron Hailsham of St Marylebone
E. F. L. Wood, 1st Earl of Halifax
Lord Claud Hamilton
Lord George Hamilton
Sir Samuel Hoare, 1st Viscount Templewood
William Joynson-Hicks
David Heathcoat-Amory
Derick Heathcoat-Amory
Edward Heath
John Hick
Boris Johnson
David Maxwell Fyfe
Rudyard Kipling
George Kynoch (formerly Deputy Chairman)
Bonar Law
Alan Lennox-Boyd
Geoffrey William Lloyd
Selwyn Lloyd
Charles Vane-Tempest-Stewart, 6th Marquess of Londonderry
Charles Vane-Tempest-Stewart, 7th Marquess of Londonderry
Walter Long, 1st Viscount Long
Harold Macmillan
Maurice Macmillan, Viscount Macmillan of Ovenden
John Major
Theresa May
Percy Mills, 1st Viscount Mills
William Morrison
Walter Guinness, 1st Baron Moyne
Gerald Nabarro
Ronald Munro-Ferguson, 1st Viscount Novar
Osbert Peake
William Wellesley Peel, 1st Earl Peel
Charles Ritchie, 1st Baron Ritchie of Dundee
Robert Gascoyne-Cecil, 3rd Marquess of Salisbury
James Gascoyne-Cecil, 4th Marquess of Salisbury
Robert Gascoyne-Cecil, 5th Marquess of Salisbury
Robert Gascoyne-Cecil, 7th Marquess of Salisbury
Robert Sanders
Guy Spier
James Stanhope, 7th Earl Stanhope
Sir Peter Tapsell
Margaret Thatcher (honorary member)
Peter Walker, Baron Walker of Worcester (former Chairman)
William Walrond, 1st Baron Waleran
Frederick Richard West
Ann Widdecombe (became first full female member in June 2008; no longer a member since standing for the Brexit Party in the 2019 EU election)
Sir Kingsley Wood
Frederick Marquis, 1st Earl of Woolton
George Wyndham
Sayeeda Warsi, Baroness Warsi

See also
List of London's gentlemen's clubs

References

Further reading

External links
Official website
Architectural description and plans – from the Survey of London online

Gentlemen's clubs in London
1832 establishments in the United Kingdom
Buildings and structures in the City of Westminster
History of the City of Westminster
Organisations associated with the Conservative Party (UK)
St James's